This is a list of commemorative postage stamps issued by the India Post between 1951 and 1960.

1951

1952

1953

1954

1956

1957

1958

1959

1960

References

External links
 Catalogue of Indian Postage Stamps

Postage stamps of India
India